Only The Beatles... is an unauthorized Beatles compilation album released in 1986 in audiocassette format, as a joint promotional campaign by Heineken Beer and EMI; consumers could obtain a copy of the album in exchange for four pull tabs from specially marked cans and £2.99.

The promotion began on 1 July 1986. After 17 days, Apple Records' legal representation intervened and ordered EMI to stop distribution of the cassette. Production and distribution were successfully halted, and the tape has since become a collector's item.

Track listing
"Love Me Do"
"Twist and Shout"
"She Loves You"
"This Boy"
"Eight Days a Week"
"All My Loving"
"Ticket to Ride"
"Yes It Is"
"Ob-La-Di, Ob-La-Da"
"Lucy in the Sky with Diamonds"
"And I Love Her"
"Strawberry Fields Forever"

References

The Beatles compilation albums